Halgerda wasinensis is a species of sea slug, a dorid nudibranch, shell-less marine gastropod mollusks in the family Discodorididae.

Distribution
This species was described from specimens collected by Cyril Crossland at Wasini Island, East Africa. It occurs in the Indian Ocean from Kenya and Tanzania south to Sodwana Bay, South Africa.

References

Discodorididae
Gastropods described in 1904